Nimrod Mbithuka Mbai (22 December 1978) is a Kenyan politician and the current Member of Parliament for Kitui East Constituency. He was elected on a UDA ticket in the August 8th elections. He won after garnering a total of 14, 256 votes against 10, 899 votes garnered by NARC's Militonic Mwendwa Kitute. The then incumbent Member of Parliament, Major (Rtd) Mutua Muluvi was fourth with 5, 436 votes. He is an ex-police officer and served as security aide to the late Francis Nyenze and later to the current Machakos County Governor Alfred Mutua. Governor Mutua appointed him to his government in 2013 after Mbai resigned from his police service. Mbai caused controversy for his rape remarks against Kitui Governor Charity Ngilu because of the governor's support for poll boycott called by former Prime Minister Raila Odinga. He later apologised following public outcry and pressure from women's rights group FIDA Kenya

Welcome to the South Eastern Kenya University (SEKU). The University is a fully fledged University located at Kwa vonza Kitui County

References

Members of the National Assembly (Kenya)
Kamba people
Jubilee Party politicians
Living people
1978 births